Treherne may refer to:

 Treherne, Manitoba, a town in southern Manitoba, Canada
 Treherne Airport, located near Treherne, Manitoba, Canada
 Treherne (South Norfolk Airpark) Aerodrome, located near Treherne, Manitoba, Canada
 Harold Treherne ( – after 1908), an English stamp forger notable for his forgeries of the stamps of India and Australia
 Treherne Parker (born 1968), an English cricketer

See also
 Traherne (disambiguation)